Niseko Volcanic Group is a volcanic group of active stratovolcanoes and lava domes situated in Hokkaidō, Japan. The volcanoes are younger than 400,000 years. The last eruption was 6,000 to 7,000 years ago. Today Iwaonupuri shows fumarolic activity.

List of peaks

Niseko Volcanic Group 
 Mount Niseko Annupuri (ニセコアンヌプリ)
 Mount Iwaonupuri (イワオヌプリ)
 Mount Waisuhorun (Weisshorn, ワイスホルン)
 Mount Nitonupuri (ニトヌプリ)
 Mount Chisenupuri (チセヌプリ)
 Mount Shirakaba (白樺山)
 Mount Mekunnaidake (目国内岳)

Raiden Volcano Group 
 Mount Raiden (雷電山)
 Mount Mekunnaidake (目国内岳)
 Mount Iwanaidake (岩内岳)

See also
 List of volcanoes in Japan

References

External links 
 Niseko - Japan Meteorological Agency 
  - Japan Meteorological Agency
 Niseko-Raiden Volcano Group - Geological Survey of Japan
 Niseko: Global Volcanism Program - Smithsonian Institution

Volcanoes of Hokkaido
Volcanic groups
Volcanism of Japan